Industrias Lácteas Asturianas (Ilas) is a company based in the Asturian parish of Anleo in the council of Navia, Spain.

History 

In 1960 Francisco Rodríguez, current president, and Pablo Mayoral put 150,000 pesetas each to found the company. They decide to install the first factory in the premises previously occupied by a ballroom. The town of Anleo is chosen as it is the only town in the area to have a telephone line.

The factory of seven workers begins to make Camembert cheese continuing its growth to the present day

Products 
Milk : Milk and milk powder
Cheese : Manufactures different types of Camembert, Gouda, Brie, Fontina, Manchego, Edam or cheese powder
Butter : Creates butter, light butter, etc.
Demineralized whey

Subsidiaries 

Old Europe Cheese, Inc. Michigan, (USA): Production capacity of 100,000 liters per day and soft cheese and pressed cheese are treated there
ILAS México, Chihuahua , (Mexico): Established in 1980, it has a production capacity of 300,000 liters of demineralized serum per day.
Beijing Evergreen Dairy Products (China): Factory dedicated to the production of powdered milk, liquid milk, butter, milkshakes, liquid yogurts and ice cream.
Le Chèvrefeuille (France): Capacity of 20,000 liters per day, and in it goat cheeses are made.
Industrias queseras del Guadarrama SL ( Madrid )
Lacteas Castellano Leonesas SA Fresno de la Ribera (Zamora) Zamorano cheese, traditional cheese, burgos cheese and cream cheese.

It also has factories in Poland, Argentina and Portugal.

References

External links
 Entrevista a Francisco Rodríguez

Dairy products companies of Spain
Companies based in Asturias
Spanish brands
Multinational food companies
Multinational dairy companies